Marko Capan (born 24 February 2004) is a Croatian professional footballer who plays as a Midfielder for Croatian club Hajduk Split.

Club career
Shorty after Capan made his debut for Hajduk Split in a Prva HNL match against Varaždin in which he assisted a goal to teammate Dario Melnjak,he extented his contract with Hajduk Split until the summer of 2026. On 15 March 2023, Capan captained Hajduk Split's youth team to victory against Borussia Dortmund in the quarterfinals of the 2022–23 UEFA Youth League, in which he scored a goal in the penalty shootout.

International career 
He has been capped for various Croatian youth national teams.

References

External links

2004 births
Living people
Sportspeople from Bjelovar
Association football midfielders
Croatian footballers
Croatia youth international footballers
HNK Hajduk Split players
Croatian Football League players